The 19th annual Venice International Film Festival was held from 24 August to 7 September 1958.

Jury
 Jean Grémillon (France) (head of jury)
 Carlos Fernández Cuenca (Spain)
 Piero Gadda Conti (Italy) 
 Alberto Lattuada (Italy)
 Hidemi Ina (Japan)
 Friedrich Luft (Germany)
 Sergei Vasilyev (Soviet Union)

Films in competition

Awards
Golden Lion:
Rickshaw Man (Hiroshi Inagaki)
Special Jury Prize:
The Lovers (Louis Malle)
La sfida (Francesco Rosi)
Volpi Cup:
 Best Actor - Alec Guinness - (The Horse's Mouth)
 Best Actress - Sophia Loren  - (The Black Orchid)
New Cinema Award
Best Film - Vlcí jáma (Jiří Weiss)
Best Actress - Jeanne Moreau - (The Lovers)
San Giorgio Prize
La sfida (Francesco Rosi)
FIPRESCI Prize
Vlcí jáma (Jiří Weiss)
Pasinetti Award
Rosemary (Rolf Thiele)
Parallel Sections - Wild Strawberries (Ingmar Bergman) & Weddings and Babies (Morris Engel)
Italian Cinema Clubs Award
Weddings and Babies (Morris Engel)

References

External links

 
 Venice Film Festival 1958 Awards on IMDb

Venice International Film Festival
Venice International Film Festival
Venice Film Festival
Film
Venice International Film Festival
Venice International Film Festival